Krypno  is a village in Mońki County, Podlaskie Voivodeship, in north-eastern Poland. It is the seat of the gmina (administrative district) called Gmina Krypno.

References

Krypno
Podlachian Voivodeship
Grodno Governorate
Białystok Voivodeship (1919–1939)
Belastok Region